Rustam Saparov (born April 10, 1978) is a retired Turkmenistani footballer.

Career
During 2007, Saparov played 14 times for Uzbek League club FC Nasaf.

Career statistics

International 

Scores and results list Uzbekistan's goal tally first, score column indicates score after each Saparow goal.

References

External links

Living people
1978 births
Turkmenistan footballers
2004 AFC Asian Cup players
Turkmenistan international footballers
Association football midfielders
FC Nasaf players
FC Aşgabat players